Nancy Yuen may refer to:

 Nancy Yuen (singer), a Hong Kong-born Singaporean singer
 Nancy Wang Yuen, an American sociologist at Biola University